Don't Stop Me Now is a talent show that aired on Sky1 from 18 March to 1 July 2012. It is hosted by Amanda Byram.

Format
Contestants try and last for 100 seconds and impress the studio audience or they are ejected.

External links

2012 British television series debuts
2012 British television series endings
Sky UK original programming